Dangerous Minds is a 1995 drama film starring Michelle Pfeiffer.

Dangerous Minds may also refer to:
 Dangerous Minds (soundtrack), the soundtrack to the 1995 film
 Dangerous Minds (TV series), a TV series based on the 1995 film
 "Dangerous Minds" (Xiaolin Showdown), an episode of the American cartoon Xiaolin Showdown
 Dangerous Mind, a drama series in Taiwan
 "Dangerous Mind", a song by Korean boy band TVXQ from their album Rising Sun
 Dangerous Minds, a website hosted by television presenter and author Richard Metzger
 Dangerous Minds, a 2017 book by Hussain Zaidi

See also
"Dangerous Mindz", a 1997 song by Gravediggaz